To Crack the Dragon Gate or Du zhang zhen long men is a 1970 Hong Kong action film directed by Fung Chi Kong in his last picture. The film stars Josephine Siao and Kenneth Tsang.

Cast
 Josephine Siao 
 Kenneth Tsang
 Petrina Fung
 Lam Kau
 Yam Yin
 Kwan Hoi San
 Yuk-Yi Yung
 Yeung Yip Wang
 Hui Ying Sau
 Ho Pak Kwong

References

External links
 
 To Crack the Dragon Gate at HKcinemamagic.com
 film at senscritique.com

1970 films
Hong Kong action films
1970s action films
1970s Cantonese-language films
1970s Hong Kong films